Ania Guédroïtz, née Princess Agnes Alexeievna Guedroitz on 15 January 1949 in Dublin, Ireland, is a Belgian actress.

Biography
Ania Guédroïtz was born in Dublin, daughter of Prince Alexis Nicolaevich Guedroitz and Oonagh Ryan (Kathleen Ryan's sister).

She lived her childhood in Belgium with her father who was remarried. Educated in Brussels, she began studying drama at the Royal Conservatory, where she obtained a first prize "with great distinction" in 1972. In addition to French, her main language, she also studied Russian and English.

She then began a professional career in various theatres in Brussels. In 1973, she married the Belgian theater actor  and had a son, Michaël Frison, born in 1974. The couple divorced in 1977.

She was made a Knight of the Order of Leopold II in 1992.

Theater

Main roles

Important supporting roles
1975-1976: Jacqueline in Oscar by 
1976-1977: Marie-Rose in Harvey by Mary Chase
1977-1978: Olympia in Don Juan by Michel de Ghelderode
1977-1978: Gwendoline in Parodies (Travesties) by Tom Stoppard
1994-1995: Thea in Hedda Gabler by Henrik Ipsen

Filmography

Television
1973: Armande de Kersaint in the television series Rue de la Grande Truanderie directed by Jacques Vernel (RTBF)
1977: Agnès in the televised version of L'École des femmes (The School for Wives) de Molière at the Château de la Bruyère in Émines directed by Michel Rochat (RTBF)

DVD
1976: Les portes claquent  - Box set "Christiane Lenain" (RTBF Editions, 2010)
1978: Le Mariage de Mademoiselle Beulemans  - Box set (RTBF Editions, 2008)

Short film at the cinema

See also

Giedroyć

References

External links
DVDs : Le Mariage de Mademoiselle Beulemans
Books : Ania Guédroïtz
Photos of Ania Guédroïtz : Archives & musée de la littérature

1949 births
Living people
Russian nobility
Belgian stage actresses
Royal Conservatory of Brussels alumni
Actresses from Brussels